The Nigerian National Assembly delegation from Anambra comprises three Senators representing Anambra Central, Anambra South, and Anambra North, and eleven Representatives representing   Anambra East/West, Anaocha/Njikoka/Dunukofia, Aguta, Nnewi North/South/Ekwusigo, Onitsha North/South, Awka North/South, Orumba North/South, Ihiala, Oyi/Ayamelum, Idemili North/South, and Ogbaru.

Fourth Republic

The 9th Assembly (2019 - 2023)

The 8th Assembly (2015 - 2019)

The 7th Assembly (2011 - 2015)

The 6th Assembly (2007 - 2011)

The 5th Assembly (2003 - 2007)

The 4th Parliament (1999 - 2003)

References

Official Website - National Assembly House of Representatives (Anambra State)
 Senator List
Nigerian House of Representatives, Members of House of Representatives in Nigeria

Politics of Anambra State
National Assembly (Nigeria) delegations by state